Jongno 5(o)-ga Station is a station on the Seoul Subway Line 1.  It is located underneath Jongno, a major street in downtown Seoul.

Station layout

Vicinity
Exit 1 : Dongdaemun Police Station
Exit 2 :
Exit 3 : Hyoje Elementary School
Exit 4 :
Exit 5 :
Exit 6 : Cheonggyecheon, Pyeonghwa Market
Exit 7 : Cheonggyecheon
Exit 8 : Dongdaemun Market

References

Seoul Metropolitan Subway stations
Metro stations in Jongno District
Railway stations opened in 1974